Amy Stewart may refer to:
 Amy Stewart (writer), American author who writes about horticulture and the natural world
 Amii Stewart (born Amy Stewart in 1956), American disco/soul/dance-pop singer, dancer and actress
 Amy Stewart (American actress) (born 1972), appeared in Wild Iris (film)
 Amy Stewart (Canadian actress), appeared in Ice Princess